Arnold Henry Page was the Dean of Peterborough in the Church of England from 1908 until 1928.

Born in Carlisle on 1 March 1851 and educated at Repton and Balliol, he was called to the bar in 1878  and  ordained in 1883. He began his career with curacies at St Mary's, Bryanston Square and St Botolph's, Bishopsgate  and was then appointed Rector of Tendring before his elevation to the Deanery. He died on 10 November 1943.

References

1851 births
People from Carlisle, Cumbria
People educated at Repton School
Alumni of Balliol College, Oxford
Deans of Peterborough
1943 deaths